Vicenta Castro Cambón (1882–1928) was an Argentine poet.

People from Morón Partido
Argentine women poets
Argentine blind people
Blind poets
1882 births
1928 deaths
20th-century Argentine poets
20th-century women writers